Cubaris is a genus of woodlice in the family Armadillidae. There are more than 100 described species in the Cubaris genus.

Behavior and Reproduction 
Cubaris species have in average lower reproduction rates and higher lifespans than other genera of isopod.

Members of the Cubaris genus is well known for their ability to conglobate; or roll up into a ball.

As pets 
Over the years, the Cubaris genus has become increasingly popular in the invertebrate hobby. Their colorful patterns and active nature make them for many keepers a very attractive genus to keep as a pet.

However, due to their slow breeding and relatively small litter size, highly sought after types can get very expensive; one example, Cubaris sp. "Rubber Ducky", is highly desired by enthusiasts due to its similarity in appearance to a rubber duck. Discovered in 2017 in Thailand, the Rubber Ducky variety breeds slowly and produces only small litter sizes, resulting in high prices.

The "Rubbery Ducky" Isopod is one of several species of Isopods in the pet trade that are not formally identified, but are strongly believed to be a member of the Cubaris genus. Prominent examples include:

 Cubaris Sp. "Rubber Ducky"
 Cubaris Sp. "Panda King"
 Cubaris Sp. "Pak Chong" 

Species identified as "Cubaris Sp." may not be formally identified, and the placement within the Cubaris genus is not certain. It is believed the popular "Shiro Utsuri" variety of isopod does not belong to the Cubaris genus, but it is commonly listed as "Cubaris sp." by various vendors.

See also
 List of Cubaris species

References

External links

 

Isopoda
Articles created by Qbugbot